Rear Admiral M Ashraful Haq NBP, NUP, BCGM, ndc, afwc, psc is a retired admiral of Bangladesh Navy He served as the Assistant Chief of Naval Staff (Operations). Prior to that, he served as Director General of Bangladesh Coast Guard. Before that, he was the Commander of Khulna Naval Area.

Early life and education 
Haq was born on 1 March 1965. After successfully completing SSC & HSC he joined Bangladesh Naval Academy on 15 October 1982 and got commissioned in Executive Branch on 15 April 1985. He is a graduate of Mirpur Staff college & National Defence College. He completed his post graduate from National Defense College, Delhi, India.

Career 
Haq served as the Sergeant-At-Arms of Bangladesh National Parliament while he was Commodore. He was managing director of Dockyard and Engineering Works Ltd and also served as Commander of Bangladesh Navy Fleet. He has gone to retirement on 28 February, 2023.

Personal life 
Rear Admiral Haq is happily married to Mrs. Farzana Kabir and blessed with a daughter.

References 

Bangladeshi Navy admirals
Bangladesh Navy personnel
Bangladesh Navy
1965 births
Living people
Director Generals of Bangladesh Coast Guard